Bourg-Archambault is a commune in the Vienne department in the Nouvelle-Aquitaine region in western France.

Bourg-Archambault has a privately owned chateau of special architectural interest: consisting of a four turreted 'keep' style building which was renovated during 2003: surrounded by a moat and having an entrance bridge and what appears to be a drawbridge tower

Geography
The Salleron forms parts of the commune's western border, then flows northward through its northern part.

See also
 Communes of the Vienne department

References

Communes of Vienne